The men's singles was one of five events of the 1914 World Hard Court Championships tennis tournament held in Paris, France from 29 May until 8 June 1914. The draw consisted of 43 players. Anthony Wilding successfully defended his title, beating Ludwig von Salm-Hoogstraeten in straight sets in the final.

Draw

Finals

Top half

Section 1

Section 2

Bottom half

Section 3

Section 4

References 

Men's Singles